Chilantaisaurus (" lizard") is a genus of large theropod dinosaur, possibly a neovenatorid or a primitive coelurosaur, from the Late Cretaceous Ulansuhai Formation of China (Turonian age, about 92 million years ago). The type species, C. tashuikouensis, was described by Hu in 1964.

Description

In 2010, Brusatte et al. estimated it to weigh , based on femur length measurements.

Classification

Hu considered Chilantaisaurus to be a carnosaur related to Allosaurus, though some subsequent studies suggested that it may be a spinosauroid, possibly a primitive member of the spinosaurid family (Sereno, 1998; Chure, 2000; Rauhut, 2001) because it had large claws on the forelimbs thought to be unique to that group. Other studies suggested that it could be a member of an alternate offshoot of neotetanuran theropods, with some similarities to allosauroids, spinosauroids, and coelurosaurians.

A 2009 study noted that it was difficult to rule out the possibility that Chilantaisaurus was the same animal as the carnosaur Shaochilong, which is from the same geological formation. However, they did note an enormous size difference between the two. Further study by Benson, Carrano and Brusatte found that it was not as closely related to Shaochilong as first thought, but that it was a carnosaur (of the family Neovenatoridae), closely related to Allosaurus as Hu had initially thought. Phylogenetic analysis published by Porfiri et al. in 2018 recovered Chilantaisaurus as a primitive coelurosaurian.

Several species have been described based on very poor remains. The species "Chilantaisaurus" sibiricus (previously informally known as either Allosaurus? sibiricus or Antrodemus? sibiricus) is based on a single distal metatarsal discovered in 1915 in the Turginskaya Svita of the Buryat Autonomous Soviet Socialist Republic, Russia, dating to the Early Cretaceous periods (Berriasian to Hauterivian stages). It is poorly described, so its relationships cannot be accurately determined (Chure, 2000) and its placement as a species of Chilantaisaurus is highly questionable. "Chilantaisaurus" maortuensis was reclassified as Shaochilong maortuensis in 2009.

An additional species named in 1979, "Chilantaisaurus" zheziangensis, based on bones from the foot and a partial tibia, is actually a therizinosaur taxon.

The cladogram below follows a 2016 analysis by Sebastián Apesteguía, Nathan D. Smith, Rubén Juarez Valieri, and Peter J. Makovicky based on the dataset of Carrano et al. (2012).

References

External links

 

Prehistoric coelurosaurs
Neovenatorids
Late Cretaceous dinosaurs of Asia
Fossil taxa described in 1964